Craigsville School, also known as Craigsville Grammar School, is a historic public school building located at Craigsville, Augusta County, Virginia. It was built in 1917, and is a large, two-story symmetrical rectangular brick building with a full double-pile, central-passage plan.  It features a one-story, wooden entrance portico and original wooden belfry atop the low-pitched hipped roof in the Colonial Revival style.  The school closed in 1968, and was converted to 14 apartments in 1982–1984.

It was listed on the National Register of Historic Places in 1985.

References

School buildings on the National Register of Historic Places in Virginia
Colonial Revival architecture in Virginia
School buildings completed in 1917
Schools in Augusta County, Virginia
National Register of Historic Places in Augusta County, Virginia
1917 establishments in Virginia